Rolf Andersen (12 September 1916 – 27 July 1990) was a Norwegian politician for the Labour Party.

He served as a deputy representative to the Parliament of Norway from Østfold during the term 1969–1973. In total he met during 5 days of parliamentary session.

References

1916 births
1990 deaths
Deputy members of the Storting
Labour Party (Norway) politicians
Østfold politicians